The F65 (known as the Nikon N65 in the U.S. and the Nikon U in Japan) is a 35mm film SLR camera introduced by Nikon in 2001.

History and Design 
Like its predecessor, the F60, the F65 was aimed at the lower end of the amateur autofocus SLR market.

Its features included autofocus, various forms of TTL light metering and different operating modes. It also included depth-of-field preview and remote shutter release, two facilities notably absent in the F60.

The F65D variant featured a date/time-imprinting facility.

In 2002, the F65 was joined by the F55, which was targeted at a new, lower price point.

Features 
 14 oz polycarbonate body
 Exposure modes: Auto-Multi Program, five Vari-Program modes, Shutter priority, Aperture Priority and full manual mode
 Built in flash (GN 40) with Auto, Slow and Rear sync modes
 5-point matrix CAM900 autofocus sensor
 Shutter speeds from 1/2000s to 30s and Bulb mode
 Supports DX-coded film up to ISO 5000

References

External links 

F065
F065